The 2022 Wirral Metropolitan Borough Council election took place on 5 May 2022 to elect members of Wirral Metropolitan Borough Council in England. This is expected to be the last election to the council where a third of councillors are elected, following recommendations from a government report into the Council's finances.

Election results

Overall election result

Overall result compared with 2021.

Changes in council composition

Prior to the election the composition of the council was:

After the election the composition of the council was:

Retiring councillors

Ward results
Results compared directly with the last local election in 2021.

Bebington

Bidston and St James

Birkenhead and Tranmere

Bromborough

Clatterbridge

Claughton

Eastham

Greasby, Frankby and Irby

Heswall

Hoylake and Meols

Leasowe and Moreton East

Liscard

Moreton West and Saughall Massie

New Brighton

Oxton

Pensby and Thingwall

Prenton

Rock Ferry

Seacombe

Upton

Wallasey

West Kirby and Thurstaston

Changes between 2022 and 2023

Liscard by-election 2022

Cllr David Brennan, first elected in 2021, announced his resignation on 2 June 2022. A by-election was held on 14 July.

Notes
• italics denote the sitting councillor • bold denotes the winning candidate

References

Wirral Metropolitan Borough Council election
2022
2020s in Merseyside